Insar is a river in the Mordovian republic of Russia. It is a right tributary of the Alatyr. It is 168 km long, with a drainage basin of 3860 km². The river gets most of its water from melting snow, and hence its discharge is at its highest during the spring thaw. Average discharge at Saransk is 7,71 m³/s. The river freezes over in November, and is icebound until April.

Towns by the Insar are Ruzayevka and Saransk.

References 

Rivers of Mordovia